The Monte gerbil mouse or Monte laucha (Eligmodontia moreni) is a species of rodent in the family Cricetidae. 
It is found only in Argentina.

References

 Baillie, J. 1996.  Eligmodontia moreni.   2006 IUCN Red List of Threatened Species.   Downloaded on 19 July 2007.
Musser, G. G. and M. D. Carleton. 2005. Superfamily Muroidea. pp. 894–1531 in Mammal Species of the World a Taxonomic and Geographic Reference. D. E. Wilson and D. M. Reeder eds. Johns Hopkins University Press, Baltimore.

Eligmodontia
Mammals of the Andes
Mammals of Argentina
Mammals described in 1896
Taxa named by Oldfield Thomas
Taxonomy articles created by Polbot